Rómulo de Jesús Campuzano González (born 8 January 1957) is a Mexican politician affiliated with the National Action Party. As of 2014 he served as Senator of the LVIII and LIX Legislatures of the Mexican Congress representing Durango.

References

1957 births
Living people
Politicians from Durango
People from Durango City
Members of the Senate of the Republic (Mexico)
National Action Party (Mexico) politicians
20th-century Mexican politicians
21st-century Mexican politicians
Monterrey Institute of Technology and Higher Education alumni
Members of the Congress of Durango